The Emphorini are a tribe of apid bees.

Genera
Alepidosceles 
Diadasia 
Diadasina 
Diadasina (Diadasina)
Diadasina (Leptometriella) 
Meliphilopsis 
Melitoma 
Melitomella 
Ptilothrix 
Toromelissa

References

Further reading
 
 

Apinae
Bee tribes